Tonsawang, also known as Tombatu, is an Austronesian language of the northern tip of Sulawesi, Indonesia. It belongs to the Minahasan branch of the Philippine languages.

Location
According to linguist James Sneddon, the language is "one of the most isolated languages", spoken in southeast Minahasa, while linguist Robert Blust situated it, along with the others of the Minahasan group, near Lake Tondano, "in the nothern peninsula of Sulawesi".

Orthography

Alphabet

 a – 
 b – 
 e – 
 è – 
 g – 
 i – 
 j – 
 k – 
 l – 
 m – 
 n – 
 ng – 
 o – 
 p – 
 r – 
 s – 
 t – 
 u – 
 w – 
 ' –

References

Further reading

 Brickell, Timothy C. (2018). "Tonsawang (Toundanow), North Sulawesi, Indonesia — Language Contexts". In: Peter K. Austin (ed.). Language Documentation and Description, vol 16. London: EL Publishing. pp. 55-85. .
 Brickell, Timothy C. (2020). "Language contact in North Sulawesi: Preliminary observations". In: Thomas J. Conners and Atsuko Utsumi, eds. Aspects of regional varieties of Malay. NUSA 68: 159–190. Permanent URL: http://repository.tufs.ac.jp/handle/94893; doi: https://doi.org/10.15026/94893
 Matu, Tania. "Bentuk Permintaan Sopan dalam Bahasa Inggris dan Bahasa Tonsawang: Suatu Analisis Kontrastif". In: Jurnal Elektronik Fakultas Sastra Universitas Sam Ratulangi Vol 1, No 3 (2018). (Abstract in English). 
 Rorong, Ferdy Dj; Lensun, Sherly; Sompotan, Amelia Gladys; Pandi, Helena; Sambeka; Fince Leny; Aror, Susanti. "Tonsawang Language Speech Acts in Traditional Medicine". In: Proceedings of the 1st International Conference on Social Sciences (ICSS 2018). Atlantis Press, 2018. pp. 903-907. . DOI: https://doi.org/10.2991/icss-18.2018.187.
 Utsumi, Atsuko (2018). The Tonsawang language’s basic morphology and syntactic features. Paper presented at The Fourteenth International Conference of Austronesian Linguistics (14-ICAL). July 17-20. Antananarivo: Universitè di Antananarivo.

External links 

 ELAR collection: Tonsawang: a collaborative multimedia project documenting an endangered language of North Sulawesi deposited by Timothy Brickell

Languages of Sulawesi
Minahasan languages